A demissionary cabinet is a type of caretaker cabinet in the Netherlands. 

A demissionary cabinet continues the current government after a cabinet has ended. This can either be after completion of the full term, between general elections (when the new House of Representatives is installed) and the formation of a new cabinet, or after a cabinet crisis. In both cases the prime minister hands in the resignation of his cabinet to the  Dutch Monarch. The Monarch will not accept full resignation until a new cabinet has been formed. Between the moment in which the prime minister hands in the resignation and the Monarch installs a new cabinet, the cabinet is labelled demissionary. As a demissionary cabinet is considered a continuation of the previous cabinet, it is not counted as a new cabinet (e.g. Balkenende IV did not become Balkenende V when becoming demissionary). 

By constitutional convention, a demissionary cabinet has fewer powers than a conventional cabinet. Besides organising elections, the main aim of a demissionary cabinet is to take care of ongoing business until the new cabinet comes into power. Thus, it can only take care of urgent and pressing matters and not initiate controversial legislation. The States General decide which affairs are urgent and pressing, and which are deemed controversial. It is a custom (which is not always followed) that the opinion of minority parties is taken into account for these decisions.

A demissionary cabinet takes care of policy during elections and cabinet formation. This is relevant as the formation process can take, in comparative terms, a very long time. An example of a very long-lasting caretaker government was the cabinet Den Uyl between 22 March and 18 December 1977, during the formation of the cabinet Van Agt-I. The first Balkenende Cabinet (2002-2003) had a demissionary phase more than twice as long as its period as a normal cabinet (7 months compared to a mere 3 months).

In the case of the fall of a cabinet, there are several ways in which a cabinet can be a caretaker cabinet;
 
 The complete cabinet stays in post until a new cabinet is formed (e.g. all the ministers of Netherlands cabinet Kok-2 stayed on as a demissionary cabinet after the fall of the cabinet over Srebrenica).
 Part of the cabinet stays in post until a new cabinet is formed (example: only CDA and CU ministers of Netherlands cabinet Balkenende-4 stayed on as a demissionary cabinet after the resignation of the PvdA ministers over Uruzgan).
 An official minority cabinet (not having demissionary status) is formed after the breaking up of a cabinet. Such a minority caretaker cabinet has as primary task to organise elections. Yet it has much more authority in proposing new law and suggestion policy compared to a demissionary cabinet. The new cabinet is seen as a successor rather than the continuation of the fallen cabinet (example Netherlands cabinet Balkenende III followed up on Netherlands cabinet Balkenende II).

See also

 Rump cabinet

Cabinet of the Netherlands
Caretaker governments
Politics of the Netherlands